Roy Deller (21 January 1913 – 2 July 1988) was  a former Australian rules footballer who played with North Melbourne and Footscray in the Victorian Football League (VFL). 

Before transferring to North Melbourne, Deller played 71 senior games and kicked 7 goals for Williamstown in the VFA from 1930-35 after being recruited from Spotswood. He played in a losing Williamstown Seconds grand final in 1929, the year before he made his senior debut.

Notes

External links 
		

1913 births
1988 deaths
Australian rules footballers from Victoria (Australia)
North Melbourne Football Club players
Western Bulldogs players
Williamstown Football Club players